Cornelius Vincent "Vince" Creagh  (2 July 1876 – 14 April 1909) was an auctioneer and member of the Queensland Legislative Assembly.

Biography
Creagh was born in Brisbane, Queensland, to parents John Creagh and his wife Margaret (née Kelly) and educated school at Brisbane and Croyden State Schools. He worked in Croyden as a clerk and an auctioneer and in 1908 he was the licensee of the Theatre Royal Hotel in Brisbane.

In the 11 Jun 1907 Creagh married Theresa Purcell (died 1973) and together had one son. He died two years later in 1909 and his funeral moved from the Theatre Royal Hotel to the Toowong Cemetery.

Political career
After being Mayor of Croydon four times he won the seat of Croydon in 1907. He was defeated just months later at the 1908 general election. In 1908 he became an alderman in the Brisbane Council.

References

Members of the Queensland Legislative Assembly
1876 births
1909 deaths
Burials at Toowong Cemetery
19th-century Australian politicians